The Jamari River is a river of Rondônia state in western Brazil.

Part of the river's watershed is covered by the  Jacundá National Forest, a sustainable use conservation unit.
The Samuel Ecological Station was established in compensation for the environmental impact. The ecological station extends to the east of the dam and protects part of the Jamari river basin.

See also
List of rivers of Rondônia

References
Brazilian Ministry of Transport

Rivers of Rondônia